Lanthanum hafnate or lanthanum hafnium oxide is a mixed oxide of lanthanum and hafnium.

Properties
Lanthanum hafnate is a colorless ceramic material with the La and Hf atoms arranged in a cubic lattice. The arrangement is a disordered fluorite-like structure below , above which it transitions to a pyrochlore phase; an amorphous phase also exists below .

The compound decomposes into its constituent oxides at 18 GPa.

Luminescence
Oxygen vacancies in the base material give luminescence spanning across the visible light spectrum, with a peak near 460 nm. The luminescent properties can be fine-tuned by doping with various rare earth and group 4 metals; for example,  nanoparticles exhibit a red photoluminescence or radioluminescence near 612 nm when exposed to ultraviolet or X-ray radiation.

Synthesis
4 La + 4 Hf + 7  → 2 .
2  + 2  →  + 7 .

References

Lanthanum compounds
Hafnium compounds
Oxides
Phosphors and scintillators
Ceramic materials